The 2015–16 season was Cambridge United's 103rd season in their history and their second consecutive season in League Two. Along with League Two, the club also competed in the FA Cup, League Cup and League Trophy. The season covered the period from 1 July 2015 to 30 June 2016.

Squad

Squad details at start of season

* Player appearances and goals for the club as of beginning of 2015–16 season.# Date of first team debut

Transfers in

Transfers out

Loans in

Loans out

Appearances

Goalscorers

Yellow cards

Red cards

Competitions

Pre-season friendlies
On 21 May 2015, Cambridge United announced they would face Coventry City in as part of their pre-season schedule. On 28 May 2015, Cambridge United announced their second pre-season friendly against Ipswich Town. On 8 June 2015, Norwich City was added to the pre-season fixture list. On 16 June 2015, a date for Chris Turner's memorial match was announced.

League Two

League table

Results by matchday

Matches
On 17 June 2015, the fixtures for the forthcoming season were announced.

August

September

October

November

December

January

February

March

April

May

FA Cup
On 26 October 2015 the draw for the first round of the FA Cup was drawn and Cambridge United host National League South side Basingstoke Town.

League Cup
On 16 June 2015, the first round draw was made, Cambridge United were drawn away against Rotherham United.

Football League Trophy
On 8 August 2015, live on Soccer AM the draw for the first round of the Football League Trophy was drawn by Toni Duggan and Alex Scott. U's host Dagenham & Redbridge.

References

Cambridge United F.C. seasons
Cambridge United